is a city located in Gifu, Japan. , the city had an estimated population of 37,705, and a population density of 220 persons per km2. Mizunami's biggest claim to fame came in 1995, when the largest ceramic plate in the world, as recognised by the Guinness Book of Records, was created by the Inatsu Town Planning Association in the city. It measures 2.8 metres in diameter.

Geography
Mizunami is located in south-eastern Gifu Prefecture. The Kiso River and the Toki River flow through the city.

Climate
The city has a climate characterized by characterized by hot and humid summers, and mild winters (Köppen climate classification Cfa).  The average annual temperature in Mizunami is 14.8 °C. The average annual rainfall is 1928 mm with September as the wettest month. The temperatures are highest on average in August, at around 27.2 °C, and lowest in January, at around 3.0 °C.

Neighbouring municipalities
Gifu Prefecture
Ena
Toki
Mitake
Yaotsu
Aichi Prefecture
Toyota

Demographics
Per Japanese census data, the population of Mizunami peaked at around the year 2000 and has declined since.

History
The area around Mizunami was part of traditional Mino Province.  During the Edo period, the area was tenryō territory under direct control of the Tokugawa shogunate. The Nakasendō highway connecting Edo with Kyoto passed through the area, and Ōkute-juku  and Hosokute-juku were located within what are now the city limits. In the post-Meiji restoration cadastral reforms, Toki District in Gifu prefecture was created. The modern city was founded on April 1, 1954 by the merger of Mizunami-Toki Town with the villages of Kamado, Okute, and Hiyoshi.

Government
Mizunami has a mayor-council form of government with a directly elected mayor and a unicameral city legislature of 16 members.

Education
Mizunami has seven public elementary schools and five public middle schools operated by the city government, and one private combined middle/high school. The city has one public high school operated by the Gifu Prefectural Board of Education and one private high school. Chukyo Gakuin University has a campus in Mizunami.

Transportation

Railway
 - JR Central - Chūō Main Line
   -

Highway
 Chūō Expressway

Sister city relations
 - Liling, Hunan, China
 - Selb, Bavaria, Germany

References

External links

 Mizunami City official website 
 Mizunami City official website

 
Cities in Gifu Prefecture